The Albertine branch is a German princely family of the House of Wettin. The name derives from the progenitor of the line, Albert III, Duke of Saxony. The Albertine branch ruled from 1485 to 1918 as dukes, electors and kings in Saxony.

History of the Albertine Branch 

Ernest and Albrecht of Saxony, the two sons of Frederick II, Elector of Saxony, initially ruled their paternal inheritance for a long time, with Ernst as the eldest being the elector. In 1485, the two brothers divided their countries (Treaty of Leipzig). Albrecht and his descendants received their own territory with Dresden as the center, which they ruled from now on as the dukes of Saxony.

While Frederick III, Elector of Saxony supported the Reformation, George, Duke of Saxony tried to prevent it in his area. It was not until his brother Henry IV, Duke of Saxony, who succeeded Georg as duke, that the Reformation was also introduced in Saxony.

Acquisition of the dignity 
Although Maurice, Elector of Saxony was also a Protestant, in 1546 he sided with Emperor Charles V against the Protestant princes of the Schmalkaldic League under the leadership of his cousin John Frederick I. After the defeat of the Protestants in the Schmalkaldic War, in 1547 he received the electoral dignity and large parts of the Ernestine lands as a reward for his services. Since then, the Albertine branch have been the leading line of the House of Wettin.

The common minting agreed between the Ernestines and Albertine branch in the main division of Leipzig in 1485 was finally abandoned. The new Albertine Elector Moritz only coins in his own name (Saxon coin separation).

Family tree of the Albertine branch

Literature 
 Konrad Sturmhoefel: Illustrated history of Saxony and their authorities. Volume 2: Illustrated History of Albertine Saxony. Hübel & Denck, Leipzig 1909.

References

External links 
 About the House of Wettin
 Family tree of the House of Wettin
 Laws of the House of Wettin from 1837

 
History of Dresden
German noble families